The 1954 Davidson Wildcats football team was an American football team that represented Davidson College during the 1954 college football season as a member of the Southern Conference. In their third year under head coach Bill Dole, the team compiled an overall record of 6–3, with a mark of 2–1 in conference play, and finished in fourth place in the SoCon.

Schedule

References

Davidson
Davidson Wildcats football seasons
Davidson Wildcats football